The  2016 United States Open Championship was the 116th U.S. Open, held June 16–19 at Oakmont Country Club in Oakmont and Plum, Pennsylvania, suburbs northeast of Pittsburgh. Dustin Johnson won his first major championship.

Play was delayed on the first day due to heavy rainfall, forcing most of the field to play half a round behind schedule. Andrew Landry was a surprise leader after the first round before Johnson led the field in the second. Shane Lowry carded a 65 in the third round to take the overall lead into the final round. Despite a controversial penalty on the 5th green, Johnson took the title three strokes ahead of runners-up Lowry, Jim Furyk and Scott Piercy.

Venue
This was the ninth U.S. Open at Oakmont and its twelfth major championship.

Course layout

Source:

Lengths of the course for previous major championships:

, par 70 - 2007 U.S. Open
, par 71 - 1994 U.S. Open
, par 71 - 1983 U.S. Open
, par 71 - 1978 PGA Championship
, par 71 - 1973 U.S. Open
, par 71 - 1962 U.S. Open

, par 72 - 1953 U.S. Open
, par 72 - 1951 PGA Championship
, par 72 - 1935 U.S. Open
, par 72 - 1927 U.S. Open
, par 74 - 1922 PGA Championship

Through 1994, the 9th hole was a par 5; before 1962, the 1st hole was also a par 5.

2016 yardages by round

Scoring average: 73.5697 
 by round: 74.2436, 73.6037, 72.0298, 73.4630
Most difficult holes in relation to par: 1, 9, 15, 10
Source:

Field
About half the field consisted of players who were exempt from qualifying for the U.S. Open. Each player is classified according to the first category in which he qualified, and other categories are shown in parentheses.

1. Winners of the U.S. Open Championship during the last ten years
Ángel Cabrera, Lucas Glover, Martin Kaymer (8,13,14), Graeme McDowell, Rory McIlroy (6,7,11,12,13,14), Geoff Ogilvy, Justin Rose (12,13,14), Webb Simpson, Jordan Spieth (5,11,12,13,14)
Tiger Woods did not play.

2. Winner and runner-up of the 2015 U.S. Amateur Championship
Derek Bard (a)
Bryson DeChambeau forfeited his exemption by turning professional in April 2016 but subsequently earned a spot through sectional qualifying.

3. Winner of the 2015 Amateur Championship
Romain Langasque forfeited his exemption by turning professional in April 2016.

4. Winner of the 2015 Mark H. McCormack Medal (men's World Amateur Golf Ranking)
Jon Rahm (a)

5. Winners of the Masters Tournament during the last five years
Adam Scott (11,13,14), Bubba Watson (12,13,14), Danny Willett (13,14)

6. Winners of The Open Championship during the last five years
Ernie Els, Zach Johnson (12,13,14), Phil Mickelson (13,14)
Darren Clarke did not play.

7. Winners of the PGA Championship during the last five years
Keegan Bradley, Jason Day (8,11,12,13,14), Jason Dufner (14)

8. Winners of The Players Championship during the last three years
Rickie Fowler (12,13,14)

9. Winner of the 2016 European Tour BMW PGA Championship
Chris Wood (13,14)

10. Winner of the 2015 U.S. Senior Open Championship
Jeff Maggert

11. The 10 lowest scorers and anyone tying for 10th place at the 2015 U.S. Open Championship
Branden Grace (13,14), Dustin Johnson (12,13,14), Shane Lowry (13,14), Louis Oosthuizen (12,13,14), Charl Schwartzel (13,14), Cameron Smith, Brandt Snedeker (12,13,14)

12. Players who qualified for the season-ending 2015 Tour Championship
Daniel Berger (13,14), Steven Bowditch, Paul Casey (13,14), Harris English (14), Jim Furyk (13,14), Bill Haas (13,14), Charley Hoffman (13,14), J. B. Holmes (13,14), Kevin Kisner (13,14), Brooks Koepka (13,14), Matt Kuchar (13,14), Danny Lee (13,14), Hideki Matsuyama (13,14), Kevin Na (13,14), Scott Piercy (13), Patrick Reed (13,14), Henrik Stenson (13,14), Robert Streb, Jimmy Walker (13,14)
Bae Sang-moon was unable to compete due to a military obligation in South Korea.

13. The top 60 point leaders and ties as of May 23, 2016 in the Official World Golf Ranking
An Byeong-hun (14), Kiradech Aphibarnrat (14), Rafa Cabrera-Bello (14), Kevin Chappell (14), Jamie Donaldson, Matt Fitzpatrick (14), Sergio García (14), Emiliano Grillo (14), James Hahn (14), Billy Horschel (14), Smylie Kaufman (14), Kim Kyung-tae (14), Chris Kirk (14), Patton Kizzire, Søren Kjeldsen (14), Russell Knox (14), Anirban Lahiri (14), Marc Leishman (14), David Lingmerth (14), Ryan Moore (14), Andy Sullivan (14), Justin Thomas (14), Jaco van Zyl (14), Lee Westwood (14), Bernd Wiesberger (14)
Thongchai Jaidee (14) did not play.

14. The top 60 point leaders and ties as of June 13, 2016 in the Official World Golf Ranking
William McGirt

15. Special exemptions given by the USGA
Retief Goosen

The remaining contestants earned their places through sectional qualifiers.
Japan: Yuta Ikeda, Yūsaku Miyazato, Toru Taniguchi, Hideto Tanihara
England: Matthew Baldwin, Grégory Bourdy, Søren Hansen, Peter Hanson, Andrew Johnston, Maximilian Kieffer, Mikael Lundberg, Matteo Manassero, Alex Norén, Lee Slattery, Sebastian Söderberg, Gary Stal, Romain Wattel
United States
Daly City, California: Mark Anguiano (L), Brandon Harkins (L), Gregor Main (L), Justin Suh (a,L), Tyler Raber (L), Miguel Tabuena
Jacksonville, Florida: Matt Borchert (L), Sam Horsfield (a), Aron Price, Tim Wilkinson
Roswell, Georgia: Frank Adams III (L), Kent Bulle, Ryan Stachler (a,L)
Rockville, Maryland: Billy Hurley III, Denny McCarthy, Chase Parker (L)
Summit, New Jersey: Chris Crawford (a,L), Jim Herman, Justin Hicks, Michael Miller (L), Rob Oppenheim, Andy Pope
Powell, Ohio: Jason Allred (L), Bryson DeChambeau, Luke Donald, Jason Kokrak, Spencer Levin, Carlos Ortiz, Patrick Rodgers, Scottie Scheffler (a), Richie Schembechler (L), Wes Short Jr. (L), Brendan Steele, Kevin Streelman, Ethan Tracy (L)
Springfield, Ohio: Charlie Danielson (a), Nick Hardy (a), Kyle Mueller (a,L), Patrick Wilkes-Krier (L)
Memphis, Tennessee: Sam Burns (a,L), Derek Fathauer, Andres Gonzales, J. J. Henry, Tom Hoge, Kang Sung-hoon, Andrew Landry (L), Dicky Pride, David Toms, D. J. Trahan
Houston, Texas: Derek Chang (L), Austin Jordan (L), Kevin Tway
Vancouver, Washington: T. J. Howe (L), Matt Marshall (L), Aaron Wise (L)

Alternates who gained entry:
Thitiphun Chuayprakong (Japan) – replaced Tiger Woods
Jeev Milkha Singh (England) – replaced Thongchai Jaidee
Thomas Aiken (Memphis) – replaced Darren Clarke
Zach Edmondson (L, Jacksonville) – claimed spot held for category 14
Tony Finau (Springfield) – claimed spot held for category 14
Kevin Foley (L, Summit) – claimed spot held for category 14
Daniel Summerhays (Powell) – claimed spot held for category 14
Mike Van Sickle (L, Rockville) – claimed spot held for category 14

(a) denotes amateur
(L) denotes player advanced through local qualifying

Nationalities in the field

Round summaries

First round
Thursday, June 16, 2016

Play was suspended three times during the morning wave of players, all for dangerous weather conditions. At 4:40 pm EDT, play was called for the day with the second wave of players yet to tee off. Only three groups, nine players, finished their first rounds.  Andrew Landry, who was ranked 624th in the world and had to go through local and sectional qualifiers, was the leader at 3 under par, with a birdie putt on his last hole, hole 9. Amateur Scottie Scheffler was the leader in the clubhouse at 1 under par.

*Started on hole 10

Friday, June 17, 2016

After more rain overnight, nearly three inches (7.5 cm) total since Wednesday, play resumed at 7:30 am under mostly sunny skies and the round was completed shortly after 3 pm. Landry, the overnight leader, had a cushy end to his round: he only brought his putter to the course, to which he sank his birdie putt to lead at 4-under par. He would not play another hole for the rest of the day (see round 2).

Second round
Friday, June 17, 2016

Play was suspended due to darkness at 8:43 pm with 27 players of the first wave still on the course and the second wave of players yet to tee off. Dustin Johnson completed his round and was tied for the lead with Andrew Landry, who had not started his second round yet, at 4 under par.

*Completed their second round on Saturday (had not yet started second round)

Saturday, June 18, 2016

The 27 members of the first wave resumed their rounds and the second wave began theirs at 7 am. The second round was completed after 2 pm; 67 players made the cut at 146 (+6) or better.

Amateurs: Rahm (+5), Scheffler (+7), Suh (+8), Burns (+9), Horsfield (+9), Hardy (+10), Mueller (+10), Crawford (+12), Bard (+15), Danielson (+19), Stachler (+24)

Third round
Saturday, June 18, 2016

The round began at 3 pm, on split tees in groupings of three; the final grouping of Dustin Johnson, Andrew Landry, and Scott Piercy teed off at 5:01 pm and completed 13 holes. Play was suspended due to darkness at 8:49 pm with Shane Lowry as the overnight leader at 5 under par, through 14 holes.

Sunday, June 19, 2016

Play resumed at 7 am and Shane Lowry birdied 15 and 17 for a round of 65 (−5) to extend his lead to four strokes. Andrew Landry bogeyed 14 and 15, but birdied 17 and 18 to move into the final pairing. Daniel Summerhays birdied 15 and eagled 17 to climb into a tie for fourth. After 54 holes, the top eight players on the leaderboard were all seeking their first major title.

Final round
Sunday, June 19, 2016

Summary
Play in the final round began at 10 am, in pairs from the first hole, with the final pair of Shane Lowry and Andrew Landry starting at 3:30 pm. Dustin Johnson shot a 69 and won his first major, three shots ahead of three runners-up. After finishing at five under par, Johnson was penalized a shot as he was judged to have made his ball move as he addressed it on the fifth green, despite being initially absolved of wrongdoing. His score was amended to four under par, but he still finished three strokes ahead. The top four of the leaderboard were the only ones left under par.

Final leaderboard

 

Source:

Scorecard
Final round

Cumulative tournament scores, relative to par

Source:

Controversy
During the final round of the tournament, there was a controversial incident on the fifth green that involved eventual winner Dustin Johnson. As he prepared to address the ball for a par putt, his ball moved slightly. Johnson stepped away, saying that he had not addressed the ball. After he spoke to an on-site rules official, he was told to carry on with his shot and sank the putt. Later, on the 12th tee, an official informed him that he might be penalized a stroke, but that no decision would be made until the round was complete. The penalty was ultimately assessed against Johnson which still left him three strokes ahead of three second-place finishers. Several of the world's top golfers, such as Jordan Spieth, Rory McIlroy, and Rickie Fowler, as well as many viewers on their local Fox stations and spectators at the course, took to social media to criticize the USGA for its decision.

Media
For the second year, Fox Sports televised the championship in the United States. The first two rounds were on FS1 cable and over-the-air on Fox, with the last two rounds shown only on Fox. In the United Kingdom and Ireland, it was carried by Sky Sports.

References

External links

United States Golf Association
Coverage on the PGA Tour's official site
Coverage on the European Tour's official site
Coverage on the PGA of America's official site
Oakmont Country Club – official site

U.S. Open (golf)
Golf in Pennsylvania
Sports competitions in Pennsylvania
U.S. Open
U.S. Open (golf)
U.S. Open
U.S. Open (golf)